Gunzburg station is an important Swabian railway junction and the only station of the large district town of Günzburg in the German state of Bavaria. The town also has the Wasserburg (Günz) station on the Central Swabian Railway. The station has six platform tracks and is classified by Deutsche Bahn as a category 3 station. It is served daily by about 125 trains of Deutsche Bahn and Agilis. The Central Swabian Railway branches from the Ulm–Augsburg railway at Günzburg station.

Location

The station is located northwest of the town center of Günzburg. To its south is the station forecourt (Bahnhofplatz), through which Siemensstraße runs. To the West Auweg passes under the tracks through an underpass. Wiesweg runs to the north of the station. The station building is located south of the tracks and has the address of Bahnhofsplatz 5.

History

The station was opened together with the Neu-Ulm–Burgau section of the Bavarian Maximilian’s Railway (Bayerische Maximiliansbahn) on 26 September 1853. The whole Ulm–Munich route was finally completed on 1 May 1854. The Central Swabian Railway was completed from Günzburg to Krumbach in 1892 and it was extended to Mindelheim in 1910.  From 2006 to 2009 the station was modernised at a cost of €8.3 million. The modernised station area was opened by the then Transport Minister, Wolfgang Tiefensee on 27 April 2009.

Infrastructure

The station has five tracks next to three platforms. Attached to the “home” platform 1 (next to the station building) is a bay platform for trains to Mindelheim (platform 1a). All platforms are covered and have digital destination displays. The central platforms are connected to the main platform by a pedestrian tunnel and are equipped with lifts to make the platforms accessible.

Platform data
Platforms lengths and heights are as follows:
 Platform 1a: length 140 m, height 55 cm
 Platform 1: length 250 m, height 55 cm
 Platform 2: length 405 m, height 76 cm
 Platform 3: length 405 m, height 76 cm
 Platform 4: length 210 m, height 55 cm
 Platform 5: length 210 m, height 55 cm

Operations

Long distance services

Günzburg is served at two-hour intervals by InterCity and EuroCity trains on line 62 connecting Frankfurt and Salzburg. In addition a pair of Intercity-Express trains stop at Gunzburg. All other InterCity and Intercity-Express trains pass through the station without stopping.

Regional services

Günzburg is served by the following regional services:

References

Railway stations in Bavaria
Railway stations in Germany opened in 1853